Opferblut is an album by Finnish black metal band Satanic Warmaster. It was released in 2003 through No Colours Records. LP version released on clear vinyl (500 copies) & on black vinyl (300 copies). Picture LP released in 2005, limited to 500 copies.

Track listing 
 "Black Destiny" (05:31)
 "Bound in Lust and Hate" (05:03)
 "A Wolf Cries in Anger" (06:49)
 "Pentagram & Wood" (06:15)
 "A Raven's Song" (04:53)
 "Rain Falls" (03:23)
 "Farewell to the Fallen" (05:14)

Credits 
 Lord Tyrant Werwolf - Vocals, Bass, Lyrics
 Lord War Torech - Guitars
 Lord Sargofagian - Session Drums
 S. Devamitra - Lyrics (on "Pentagram & Wood")

2003 albums
Satanic Warmaster albums

fi:Carelian Satanist Madness